Oliver Cicero Wiley (January 30, 1851 – October 18, 1917) was a U.S. Representative from Alabama, brother of Ariosto Appling Wiley.

Born in Troy, Alabama, Wiley attended the common schools.
He served as member of the town council for five years.
He served as chairman of the Democratic executive committee of Pike County in 1884–1886.
He served as member of the Democratic State executive committee in 1888.
He was president of the Alabama Midland Railway during its construction, from 1887 to 1892.
He served as president of the board of directors of the State normal college at Troy, Alabama.
He served as director of the Farmers & Merchants' National Bank at Troy.
He served as vice president and general manager of the Standard Chemical & Oil Co. at Troy.

Wiley was elected as a Democrat to the Sixtieth Congress to fill the vacancy caused by the death of his brother, Ariosto Appling Wiley, and served from November 3, 1908, to March 3, 1909.
He died in Troy, Alabama, October 18, 1917.
He was interred in Oakwood Cemetery.

References

External links

1851 births
1917 deaths
Troy University
People from Troy, Alabama
Democratic Party members of the United States House of Representatives from Alabama
19th-century American politicians
20th-century American politicians